Meadow Hot Springs are a system of geothermal springs South of Fillmore, Utah, near the town of Meadow.

Description
Three large soaking pools with ledges for sitting have been formed by travertine deposits. The travertine pools are more than 20 feet deep.

In 2019 a Utah man drowned in one of the hot springs after fully submerging himself under the water. His body was found underneath a rock ledge in the spring. He had sustained head injuries. His was one of four such drownings at the springs in 10 years.

Water profile
The hot mineral water emerges from an underwater cave in the travertine formation at a temperature of 106 °F / 41 °C. The water is very clear, and blue in color.

See also
 List of hot springs in the United States
 List of hot springs in the world

References

Hot springs of Utah